Rosemarie Biesinger is a retired slalom canoeist who competed for West Germany in the 1950s and the 1960s. She won three medals at the ICF Canoe Slalom World Championships with a gold (Folding K-1: 1955) and two silvers (Folding K-1 team: 1955, 1957).

References

West German female canoeists
Possibly living people
Year of birth missing (living people)
Medalists at the ICF Canoe Slalom World Championships